The Phonological Awareness for Literacy (PAL) Program (Burrows, Allison, Barnett, and Savina, 2007) is a commercial literacy therapy program for use by speech therapists designed to improve  phonological awareness skills required for literacy in children aged 8 – 12. It aims to create/strengthen awareness of the relationship between phonological awareness skills to reading and writing.

Theoretical foundations 
Adapted from Auditory Discrimination in Depth (Lindamood & Lindamood, 1975), which is now known as the Lindamood Phoneme Sequencing (LiPS) Program.

Intervention description 
The PAL introduces identification, segmentation, blending and manipulation of speech sounds in syllables. It does not encourage reading using the whole-word approach instead teaching children to break written words up into individual graphemes and matching letters with their corresponding phonemes before reassembling the phonemes back into words to read.

Key skills taught 

Developing an awareness of linguistic terms: Checks child's understanding of literacy terminology used and teaches the child how to talk about language (metalinguistic skills).

Sound–symbol association: Determines child's knowledge of how letters and sounds correspond, and that can be several representations of each sound.

Block representation of Consonant or vowel sequences: This component facilitates the child's ability to segment words into individual phonemes through developing auditory analysis skills. A single block represents an individual sound, and a row of blocks represent a string of sounds; so that the number of blocks directly correlates to the number of sounds in the sequence.

Block representation of syllables: Once the child understands that syllables consist of sounds, they then have to count the number of sounds, the order and distinguish between phonetic features. N.B. all block representation tasks deal only with non-words; this is to prevent the child from using pre-learned spelling patterns to respond to the tasks.

Reading and spelling non-words: This builds on previously learnt skills by using block representation to read and spell non-words. The child is encouraged to employ metalinguistic knowledge to describe changes.

Reading and spelling real words: Children learn to transfer the aforementioned foundation skills to simple/regular real words, which do not require specific spelling rules.

Components of therapy 

simple words

complex words

multisyllabic words

Each level consists of subsections of teaching, auditory analysis, decoding and encoding. Children progress from non-words to real words within each level, prior to commencing the next level. The design of the program ensures that the child is not exposed to more difficult tasks before acquiring the necessary skills at preceding levels.

Level 1 (simple words): Simple syllables with structures up to a consonant–vowel–consonant (CVC) level. The focus of this level is the ability to decode and encode CVC syllables, before applying this skill in reading and spelling. This incorporates the learning of long and short vowels in addition to consonants. Words used at this level have consistent grapheme-phoneme correspondences (GPCs).

Level 2 (complex words): Consonant clusters are introduced, in addition to application of specific rules (e.g. borrower c and g, and Magic E).

Level 3 (multisyllabic words): Specific teaching on how to break words up into syllables and the introduction of grammatical morphemes. This level builds on the previously learned abilities of segmenting and manipulating sounds by transferring these skills to syllables within multisyllabic words.

Materials/Training Required 

The manual
Coloured blocks, letter tiles
Record sheets and file/folder
Suitable reinforcement (stickers, stamps etc.)

Therapy should be delivered by a suitably qualified speech therapist.

Alternative/Similar Interventions 
Reading Freedom Remedial Reading Program (Calder, 1992)

Sounds Abound. Listening, Rhyming & Reading (Catts, 1993)

Auditory Discrimination in Depth (Lindamood and Lindamood, 1975)

A Sound Way (Love and Reily, 1995)

References

Speech and language pathology